Senior (shortened as Sr.) means "the elder" in Latin and is often used as a suffix for the elder of two or more people in the same family with the same given name, usually a parent or grandparent. It may also refer to:

 Senior (name), a surname or given name 
 Senior (education), a student in the final year of high school, college or university
 Senior citizen, a common designation for a person 65 and older in UK and US English
 Senior (athletics), an age athletics category
 Senior status, form of semi-retirement for United States federal judges
 Senior debt, a form of corporate finance
 Senior producer, a title given usually to the second most senior person of a film of television production.

Art
 Senior (album), a 2010 album by Röyksopp
 Seniors (film), a 2011 Indian Malayalam film
 Senior (film), a 2015 Thai film
 The Senior, a 2003 album by Ginuwine
 The Seniors, a 1978 American comedy film

See also
 Pages that begin with "Senior"
 Seniority
 Senioritis, colloquial term used in the United States and Canada
 Sr. (disambiguation)
 Twelfth grade, also called senior year of high school
 Wise old man, archetype

Men
Ageing